Elachista senecai is a moth in the family Elachistidae. It was described by Traugott-Olsen in 1992. It is found in Libya.

References

Moths described in 1992
senecai
Moths of Africa